Lucky is an English and Indian language unisex given name and surname.

Notable people with the name include:

Given name
Lucky Ali (born 1958), Indian singer
Lucky Dube (1964–2007), South African reggae musician
Lucky Enam (born 1952), Bangladeshi actress
Lucky Igbinedion (born 1957), Nigerian politician
Lucky McKee (born 1975), American director
Lucky Oceans (born 1951), American musician
Lucky Office (born 1976), Zimbabwean sculptor
Lucky Peterson (1964–2020), American musician
Lucky Blue Smith (born 1998), American model, actor and musician

Surname
Gillian Lucky (born 1967), Trinidad and Tobago politician
Marlon Lucky (born 1986), American football player
Robert W. Lucky (born 1936), American engineer

See also
List of people known as Lucky or the Lucky

Given names
English-language unisex given names
Indian unisex given names
Hypocorisms